Anaerofustis is a Gram-positive, strictly anaerobic, rod-shaped and non-spore-forming bacterial genus from the family of Eubacteriaceae with one known species (Anaerofustis stercorihominis). Anaerofustis stercorihominis was isolated from human feces.

References

Clostridiaceae
Bacteria genera
Monotypic bacteria genera